Eudonia meristis is a moth of the family Crambidae. It is endemic to the Hawaiian islands of Oahu, Molokai, Kauai and Hawaii.

The larvae feed on moss.

Subspecies
Eudonia meristis meristis (Oahu, Molokai, Hawaii)
Eudonia meristis halmaea Meyrick, 1899 (Kauai)

External links

Moths described in 1899
Eudonia
Endemic moths of Hawaii